The Rogue-Umpqua Scenic Byway is a National Scenic Byway in the U.S. state of Oregon.  It provides a tour of the environs of the  North Umpqua River, the High Cascades, and the Upper Rogue River.

Route description 
Starting from Roseburg on OR 138, at the junction with Interstate 5, the scenic byway travels eastward. Near Glide, it begins to parallel the North Umpqua River. It continues roughly eastward until it meets Diamond Lake, where it turns southward along the east shore of the lake. Near the southern tip of the lake the scenic byway turns west and then southwest on OR 230. Here it follows the Rogue River, eventually merges with OR 62 near Union Creek. On its last leg the route meets up with OR 234 and passes near Upper and Lower Table Rock. The byway's terminus is at Gold Hill.

History 
The road was designated a National Forest Scenic Byway on October 21, 1990, by the National Forest Service. It was later named an Oregon State Scenic Byway on February 19, 1997, and a National Scenic Byway on June 13, 2002.

Major intersections

References

External links
Official web site

National Scenic Byways
Scenic highways in Oregon
Cascade Range
Umpqua National Forest
Rogue River-Siskiyou National Forest
Tourist attractions in Douglas County, Oregon
Tourist attractions in Jackson County, Oregon
1990 establishments in Oregon